Hungarorum may refer to :

Chronica Hungarorum is the title of several works treating the early Hungarian history
Constanti Hungarorum is an 1893 encyclical of Pope Leo XIII on the Church in Hungary.
Gesta Hungarorum is a record of early Hungarian history.
The Gesta Hunnorum et Hungarorum is one of the sources of early Hungarian history.